is a Japanese table tennis player. She competed at the 1992 Summer Olympics and the 1996 Summer Olympics.

References

1971 births
Living people
Japanese female table tennis players
Olympic table tennis players of Japan
Table tennis players at the 1992 Summer Olympics
Table tennis players at the 1996 Summer Olympics
Sportspeople from Sendai
Asian Games medalists in table tennis
Table tennis players at the 1994 Asian Games
Asian Games bronze medalists for Japan
Medalists at the 1994 Asian Games